Jean-Michel Ferri (born 7 February 1969) is a former France international footballer who played midfielder.

He won the championship with FC Nantes in 1995. He joined Liverpool near the end of his career in 1998, but left after playing just 47 minutes for the club in two appearances as a substitute under manager Gérard Houllier.

Honours
Nantes Atlantique
Division 1: 1994–95

France
Kirin Cup: 1994

References

External links

LFCHistory Profile

1969 births
Living people
Association football defenders
Association football midfielders
French footballers
France international footballers
FC Nantes players
İstanbulspor footballers
Liverpool F.C. players
FC Sochaux-Montbéliard players
Ligue 1 players
Ligue 2 players
Süper Lig players
Premier League players
Expatriate footballers in England
Expatriate footballers in Turkey
French expatriate footballers